Jhamak Kumari ghimire was born on 21 Ashar 2037 B.S (Nepali date) .(4 July 1980 English date)

Jhamak Kumari Ghimire (Born on 4 July 1980) is a Nepali writer.  She was born with cerebral palsy and writes with her left foot. She is columnist at the Kantipur newspaper . She had been awarded with the Madan Puraskar (the most popular award given to the writer for his or her contribution in Nepalese Literature) for her auto-biography Jiwan Kada Ki Phool (Is Life a Thorn or Flower). In addition, Ghimire was awarded by Kabita Ram Bal Sahitya Prativa Puraskar (2015), Aswikrit Bichar Sahitya Puraskar (2016), and Madan Puraskar (2010).

Works

Selected poetry
 Sankalpa (Vow)
 Aafnai Chita Agni Shikhatira (Own's funeral pyre towards the fire apex)
 Manchhe Bhitraka Yoddaharu (Warriors inside humans)
 Quaati

Miscellaneous
 Awasan Pachhiko Aagaman (Arrival after the death)

Awards

Madan Puraskar, 2010 for Jiwan Kada Ki Phool
Padmashree Sahitya Puraskar, 2010 for Jiwan Kada Ki Phool
Kabita Ram Bal Sahitya Prativa Puraskar 2015 Aswikrit Bichar Sahitya Andolan
Aswikrit Bichar Sahitya Puraskar 2016 Aswikrit Bichar Sahitya Andolan

References

The Kathmandu Post

21st-century Nepalese poets
Nepalese people with disabilities
Living people
1980 births
Nepalese women poets
Madan Puraskar winners
People from Dhankuta
21st-century Nepalese women writers
People with cerebral palsy
Nepalese memoirists
Padmashree Sahitya Puraskar winners
Khas people